The 1992 Copa del Rey Final was the 90th final of the Copa del Rey. The final was played at Santiago Bernabéu Stadium in Madrid, on 27 June 1992 after UEFA Euro 1992, being won by Atlético Madrid, who beat Real Madrid 2–0.

Details

See also
Madrid derby

References

1992
1
Atlético Madrid matches
Real Madrid CF matches
Copa del Rey
Madrid Derby matches